Elliot Glen (born 20 December 1998), better known by the stage name Ellie Diamond, is a Scottish drag performer most known for competing on the second series of RuPaul's Drag Race UK.

Career
Diamond has been as a drag performer since 2015 in Dundee, and has said that although there isn't an established drag scene there, she hopes that to start it. Her drag name derives from the feminine version of her birth name, Elliot and Diamond is inspired by British singers: Ellie Goulding, Marina and The Diamonds and Hannah Diamond, and that in drag she "shines like a diamond". In December 2020, Diamond was announced as one of twelve contestants competing on the second series of RuPaul's Drag Race UK, and placed fourth overall in the competition. In March 2021, Diamond, alongside her fellow RuPaul's Drag Race UK finalists Lawrence Chaney, Bimini Bon Boulash and Tayce, was photographed and interviewed for The Guardian and later British Vogue. In February 2022, Diamond will embark on RuPaul's Drag Race UK: The Official Tour alongside the entire cast of the second series of RuPaul's Drag Race UK, in association with World of Wonder and promoter Voss Events.

Filmography

Television

Discography

As featured artist

Stage

References

1998 births
Living people
20th-century Scottish LGBT people
21st-century Scottish LGBT people
RuPaul's Drag Race UK contestants
Scottish drag queens
Scottish gay men